Sekmai Bazar is a town and a nagar panchayat in Imphal West district in the Indian state of Manipur.

Demographics
 India census, Sekmai Bazar had a population of 4325. Males constitute 50% of the population and females 50%. Sekmai Bazar has an average literacy rate of 66%, higher than the national average of 59.5%: male literacy is 72%, and female literacy is 59%. In Sekmai Bazar, 14% of the population is under 6 years of age.

Politics
Sekmai is part of Inner Manipur (Lok Sabha constituency).

References

Cities and towns in Imphal West district